William Jennings Reid, Jr. (born September 10, 1957) is an American basketball coach and former professional player. Reid was selected in the 1979 NBA Draft by the Indiana Pacers and then again one year later in the 1980 NBA draft by the Golden State Warriors, although he did not begin his professional career until 1980 after graduating from the University of San Francisco.

References

External links
Southern Miss coaching profile
Rhode Island coaching profile

1957 births
Living people
American expatriate basketball people in China
American expatriate basketball people in France
American expatriate basketball people in Italy
American expatriate basketball people in Japan
American expatriate basketball people in Spain
American expatriate basketball people in Venezuela
American men's basketball players
Atlantic City Hi-Rollers players
Basketball players from New York City
DeWitt Clinton High School alumni
Golden State Warriors draft picks
Golden State Warriors players
High school basketball coaches in the United States
Indiana Pacers draft picks
New Mexico Lobos men's basketball players
Reims Champagne Basket players
Rhode Island Rams men's basketball coaches
San Francisco Dons men's basketball coaches
San Francisco Dons men's basketball players
Shooting guards
Southern Miss Golden Eagles basketball coaches
Sportspeople from the Bronx
Stony Brook Seawolves men's basketball coaches